Bruno Cesari (24 October 1933 – 30 January 2004) was an Italian art director. He won an Academy Award in the category Best Art Direction for the film The Last Emperor.

He received his second Oscar nomination at the 2000 Academy Awards for his work on the film The Talented Mr. Ripley, which he shared with Roy Walker.

Selected filmography
 The Last Emperor (1987)
 The Talented Mr. Ripley (1999)

References

External links

1933 births
2004 deaths
People from Pesaro
Italian art directors
Best Art Direction Academy Award winners
David di Donatello winners
Ciak d'oro winners